Nemacerota speideli is a moth in the family Drepanidae. It was described by Saldaitis, Ivinskis and Borth in 2014. It is found in China (Sichuan).

Subspecies
Nemacerota speideli speideli (China: Sichuan)
Nemacerota speideli severa Saldaitis, Ivinskis & Borth, 2014 (China: Sichuan)

References

Moths described in 2014
Thyatirinae